Coenus or Koinos was according to later tradition the second king of the ancient Greek kingdom of Macedonia.

The Macedonian historian Marsyas of Pella relates the following aetiological story regarding his name: "...a certain Knopis from Colchis came to Macedonia and lived in the court of Caranus; when the royal male child was born, Caranus had the desire to name him after his father, Kiraron or Kararon, but the mother opposed and wanted after her father the child to be named. When Knopis was asked responded: by neither name. Therefore he was called Koinos (common)".

See also
Chronicon (Eusebius)

References

 

8th-century BC Macedonian monarchs
Argead kings of Macedonia
Old Macedonian kingdom
Mythology of Macedonia (ancient kingdom)